The 1896 Kansas Jayhawks football team represented the University of Kansas in the Western Interstate University Football Association (WIUFA) during the 1896 college football season. In their third and final season under head coach Hector Cowan, the Jayhawks compiled a 7–3 record (2–1 against conference opponents), finished in second place in the WIUFA, and outscored all opponents by a combined total of 136 to 40. The Jayhawks played their home games at McCook Field in Lawrence, Kansas. B. D. Hamill was the team captain.

Schedule

References

Kansas
Kansas Jayhawks football seasons
Kansas Jayhawks football